This article lists the tallest buildings in the US city of Hartford, Connecticut, that are at least 61 meters (200 feet) in height. The tallest building in Hartford is the commercial office building City Place I, a 163-meter skyscraper with 38 floors.

Tallest under construction, approved and proposed 
This lists buildings that are under construction, approved for construction or proposed for construction in Hartford.

* Table entries with dashes (—) indicate that information regarding building heights, floor counts, or dates of completion has not yet been released.

See also
List of tallest buildings in Connecticut

References

Hartford, Conn
Tallest buildings in Hartford, Connecticut